The New Zealand Under 21s rugby union team was a national representative team for players aged under-21. In 2008, in accordance with new IRB rule, the New Zealand Under 21s and the Under 19s were both permanently replaced by the New Zealand Under 20s for the inaugural 2008 IRB Junior World Championship.

History
New Zealand Under 21 (formerly Colts) was first selected in 1955 and played annually until 2007. The Under 21s enjoyed success on the world stage, winning SANZAR/UAR tournaments and world titles in:
2000
2001
2003
2004

See also

 New Zealand national schoolboy rugby union team
 New Zealand national under-19 rugby union team
 New Zealand national under-20 rugby union team
 Junior All Blacks

External links
New Zealand Teams website

under21